Hamiri (also Romanized as Ḩamīrī; also known as Khamīrī) is a village in Howmeh Rural District, in the Central District of Qeshm County, Hormozgan Province, Iran. At the 2006 census, its population was 27, in 6 families.

References 

Populated places in Qeshm County